Gaudiosus may refer to:

St. Gaudiosus of Naples
St. Gaudiosus of Tarazona